The Sid Watson Award is an annual award given to the top player in NCAA Division III Men's Ice Hockey. It is given by the American Hockey Coaches Association. It was known as the Division III Men's Player of the Year Award prior to 2005.

In 2004, the AHCA voted to rename the Division III Men's Player of the Year after Sid Watson. The award is named for longtime Bowdoin College hockey coach and athletic director Sid Watson, who died in April 2004 at age 71. Watson played four seasons in the NFL before starting his coaching career at Bowdoin in 1958.

Due to the COVID-19 pandemic, the award was not conferred during the 2021 season.

Award winners

Winners by school

Winners by position

See also
Hobey Baker Award - D-I men
Laura Hurd Award - D-III women
Patty Kazmaier Award - D-I women

References

College ice hockey player of the year awards in the United States
College men's ice hockey in the United States
NCAA Division III ice hockey
Bowdoin Polar Bears men's ice hockey
Awards established in 1993
1993 establishments in the United States